Westphal's sign is the clinical correlate of the absence or decrease of patellar reflex or knee jerk. Patellar reflex or knee jerk is a kind of deep or stretch reflex where an application of a stimulus to the patellar tendon such as strike by a solid object or hammer caused the leg to extend due to such stimulus causes the quadriceps femoris muscle to contract.

It is named for Karl Friedrich Otto Westphal (1833-1890).



Associated conditions
Westphal's sign has a clinical significance used in determining neurodisorders or diseases such as:
 receptor damage, peripheral nerve disease, involving the dorsal(sensory) columns of the spinal cord  and cerebellar lesions
 lesions present within the motor cortex of the brain or the pyramidal tracts which it combined with muscular spasms
 complete interruption of sensory and/or motor impulse transmission in the femoral nerve

References

 

Symptoms and signs: Nervous system
Examination of the knee